William Horwood, also Horewud, was an English polyphonic vocal composer in the late-medieval period ( 1430 – 1484). In 1470, he was a singer at Lincoln Cathedral, in 1476, he was a vicar choral at Lincoln, and from 1477 until 1484, he was the Cathedral choirmaster. He has three complete pieces and one incomplete piece in the Eton Choirbook, and one incomplete piece in a York manuscript.

Horwood's "Magnificat secundi toni a 5" bears a strong resemblance to compositions of his near contemporary Josquin des Prez (c. 1440–1521), so much so that he might easily be mistaken for Josquin upon first audition. No mention is made of Horwood among the listing of Josquin's contemporaries in Grout; neither is the Eton Choirbook mentioned in Grout.

A very scanty on-line article – only a thumbnail description of the composer – is present on (FM 99.5, New York) WBAI producer Chris Whent's Here of a Sunday Morning site. (The link Partial William Horwood Discography has no content.) Virtually no other information is available on the internet.

Works
 Eton 17. f. 30v-32: Salve regina mater misericordiae
 Eton 36. f. 74v-76: Gaude flore virginali
 Eton 37. f. 76v-77v: Gaude virgo mater Christi (incomplete)
 Eton 71. f. 111v-113: Magnificat
 York manuscript: Kyrie (incomplete)

Discography
 Magnificat a 5 – on "Creator of the Stars: Christmas Music from Earlier Times", reissued as "Old World Christmas", Archiv Produktion
 Magnificat a 5 – Huelgas Ensemble, The Eton Choirbook, DHM
 Gaude flori virginali – "Mediaeval Carols", Opus Anglicanum, Herald

References

1430s births
1484 deaths
15th-century English people
English classical composers
Renaissance composers
English male classical composers